The 1987 Cricket World Cup (officially known as the Reliance Cup 1987 for sponsorship reasons) was the fourth Cricket World Cup. It was held from 8 October to 8 November 1987 in India and Pakistan – the first such tournament to be held outside England. The one-day format was unchanged from the eight-team 1983 event except for a reduction in the number of overs a team played from 60 to 50, the current standard for all ODIs.

The competition was won, for the first time, by Australia who defeated their arch-rivals England by seven runs in the second-most closely fought World Cup final to date in Kolkata's Eden Gardens stadium. The two host nations, India and Pakistan failed to reach the final, after both being eliminated in the semi-finals. The West Indies failed to live up to expectations and did not advance from the group stage.

Format
The format of the competition was two groups of four teams each team playing each other twice in 50-over matches. The top two teams from each group would advance to the semi-finals where the two winners would then advance to the final. All matches were played during daytime and– for the final time in the tournament's history– saw the teams appear in traditional white clothing and use traditional red balls as used in Test/First Class matches.

Qualification

The ICC decreed that all seven (eligible) countries holding Test status would automatically qualify for the tournament; One additional entry place would be awarded to the winners of the 1986 ICC Trophy; for the second time this was Zimbabwe, who defeated the Netherlands to earn the berth.

The following eight teams participated in the final tournament:
 
 
  (hosts)
 
  (hosts)

Venues

Squads

Group stage

Group A

Group B

Note 1: This match was scheduled for 12 October but abandoned without play due to rain. The reserve day was instead used.
Note 2: Rain interrupted the Sri Lankan innings; their target was reduced to 267 in 45 overs by the Average Run Rate method.

Knockout stage

Semi-finals
Australia won the toss and chose to bat. The Australian batsmen got off to a very good start, and they scored fluently, with David Boon (65 from 91 balls, 4 fours) top scoring, and making an 82 run second-wicket partnership with DM Jones. Australia were looking to reach 300 with strong batting before Imran Khan took 3 wickets for 17 runs in 5 overs. Australia lost 4/31, but a high number of extras (34) from the Pakistani bowlers, as well as the solid batting from earlier on, brought Australia to 267 (6 wickets, 50 overs).
Pakistan started badly, falling to 3/38. Imran Khan (58 from 84 balls, 4 fours) and Javed Miandad (70 from 103 balls, 4 fours) shared a partnership of 112 runs in 26 overs. However, with the required run rate at 7.87 runs when Miandad fell, there was just too much for the upcoming batsmen to do, and Pakistan lost 6/99 as they were bowled all out for 249 (all out, 49 overs). Earlier Steve Waugh scored 18 runs off the 50th over bowled by Saleem Jaffar and ironically Pakistan lost the match by 18 runs.

India won the toss and chose to field. After reaching 2/79, Graham Gooch (115 from 136 balls, 11 fours) and captain Mike Gatting (56 from 62 balls, 5 fours) shared a partnership of 117 runs in 19 overs. After Gooch was finally stumped, 51 more runs were added, and England reached 254 (6 wickets, 50 overs).
India made a bad start, falling to 3/73. The middle order scored fluently, with Mohammed Azharuddin, (64 from 74 balls, 7 fours) top scoring. Before Azharuddin was removed lbw by Eddie Hemmings, India were at 5/204, needing 50 runs from the last 10 overs, with 5 wickets in hand, and it looked like it would be a very close game. However, the middle and tailend order for India collapsed, as India lost 5/15. India were eventually bowled all out for 219 (all out, 45.3 overs), giving England both a berth in the final and a measure of revenge for the loss they suffered to India in the semi-final of the World Cup four years earlier in England.

Final

Australia won the toss and chose to bat. David Boon (75 from 125 balls, 7 fours) top-scored for Australia, whose batsmen scored fluently. Australia posted 253 (5 wickets, 50 overs). Mike Veletta (45 from 31 balls, 6 fours) cut loose late in the innings, as Australia scored 65 runs from the last six overs of their innings.
In the English reply, opener Tim Robinson was out LBW for a first ball duck. Bill Athey (58 from 103 balls, 2 fours) top-scored, and England were almost on target, when captain Mike Gatting (41 from 45 balls, 3 fours, 1 six) handed back the initiative with the loss of his wicket, going for a reverse sweep which ended a growing partnership of 69 runs in 13 overs between him and Athey. Allan Lamb (45 from 55 balls, 4 fours) also posted a great innings, but it was in vain as the required run-rate for England began to rise. When England failed to score the last 17 runs from the final over, the cup went to Australia.

Statistics

Records
 The first hat-trick in Cricket World Cup history was taken by Chetan Sharma of India during their final group match against New Zealand. He clean bowled Ken Rutherford, Ian Smith and Ewen Chatfield with last three balls of the 42nd over.

References

External links
Scorecards of all the 1987 World Cup matches from Cricket Fundas
Cricket World Cup 1987 from Cricinfo
Cricket World Cup 1987
1987 Cricket World Cup 

 
1987
World Cup
World Cup
International cricket competitions from 1985–86 to 1988
International cricket competitions in India
International cricket competitions in Pakistan
Cricket World Cup
Cricket World Cup
Reliance Industries